Aleksandar Jovičić (born 18 July 1995) is a Bosnian professional footballer who plays as a centre-back for Nemzeti Bajnokság I club Kisvárda and the Bosnia and Herzegovina national team.

Jovičić started his professional career at Rudar Prijedor, before joining Borac Banja Luka in 2014. The following year, he was loaned to Krupa. Later that year, he went back to Rudar Prijedor. In 2016, Jovičić moved to Slaven Belupo, who sent him on loan to Istra 1961 in 2018. Later that year, he signed with Gorica. In 2022, he moved to Kisvárda

A former youth international for Bosnia and Herzegovina, Jovičić made his senior international debut in 2021.

Club career

Early career
Jovičić came through Rudar Prijedor's youth setup, which he joined in 2002. He made his professional debut against Željezničar on 24 April 2013 at the age of 17.

In the summer of 2014, he switched to Borac Banja Luka. In February 2015, he was sent on a six-month loan to Krupa. On 11 April, he scored his first professional goal against Tekstilac.

In July, he returned to Rudar Prijedor.

In July 2016, Jovičić moved to Croatian side Slaven Belupo. In February 2018, he was loaned to Istra 1961 until the end of season.

In July, he signed with Gorica.

In November 2022, he moved to Hungarian outfit Kisvárda.

International career
Jovičić was a member of Bosnia and Herzegovina under-21 team under coach Darko Nestorović.

In May 2021, he received his first senior call-up, for friendly games against Montenegro and Denmark. He debuted against the former on 2 June.

Career statistics

Club

International

References

External links

1995 births
Living people
Sportspeople from Banja Luka
Serbs of Bosnia and Herzegovina
Bosnia and Herzegovina footballers
Bosnia and Herzegovina under-21 international footballers
Bosnia and Herzegovina international footballers
Bosnia and Herzegovina expatriate footballers
Association football central defenders
FK Rudar Prijedor players
FK Borac Banja Luka players
FK Krupa players
NK Slaven Belupo players
NK Istra 1961 players
HNK Gorica players
Kisvárda FC players
Premier League of Bosnia and Herzegovina players
First League of the Republika Srpska players
Croatian Football League players
Nemzeti Bajnokság I players
Expatriate footballers in Croatia
Expatriate footballers in Hungary
Bosnia and Herzegovina expatriate sportspeople in Croatia
Bosnia and Herzegovina expatriate sportspeople in Hungary